Nokha railway station is a small railway station in Bikaner district, Rajasthan. Its code is NOK. It serves Nokha town. The station consists of two platforms. Neither is that well sheltered but are quite useful. The station has basic facilities.

References
It has 2 platform , both are not fully sheltered . it has a shop in platform . 

the ticket counters open till 7 PM in the evening . it has no security . it has 3 tracks . over bridge is also there .

very neat and clean railway station.

parking facility is there .

you can book a car for nearby location , outside the railway station .

very peaceful railway station

drinking water is also available there.

Railway stations in Bikaner district
Jodhpur railway division